A zip-line, zip line, zip-wire, flying fox, or death slide is a pulley suspended on a cable, usually made of stainless steel, mounted on a slope. It is designed to enable cargo or a person propelled by gravity to travel from the top to the bottom of the inclined cable by holding on to, or being attached to, the freely moving pulley. It has been described as essentially a Tyrolean traverse that engages gravity to assist its speed of movement. Its use is not confined to adventure sport, recreation, or tourism, although modern-day usage tends to favor those meanings.

History
Ropeways or aerial cables have been used as a method of transport in some mountainous countries for more than 2,000 years, possibly starting in China, India and Japan as early as 250 BC, remaining in use in some remote areas in China such as Nujiang (Salween) valley in Yunnan as late as 2015 before being replaced by bridges. Not all of these structures were assisted by gravity, so not all fitted the definition of the zip-line.

Various technological advances in Europe in the Middle Ages improved the power-line's ropeways, some of which were still assisted by gravity.

The first recorded use of the zip-line as a form of entertainment was possibly in 1739, when Robert Cadman, a steeplejack and ropeslider, died when descending from Shrewsbury's St Mary's Church when his rope snapped. In literature, one appears in The Invisible Man (published 1897) by H. G. Wells as part of a Whit Monday fair and referred to as "an inclined strong".

Some sources attribute the development of zip-lines used today as a vacation activity to the Tyrolean traverses developed for mountaineering purposes.

In the Australian outback, zip-lines were sometimes used for delivering necessities to people working in or on the other side of a valley, and they may have been used in conflicts by Australian troops to deliver food, mail and even ammunition to forward positions.

Current uses

As a means of transport
Yungas, Bolivia, features a system of zip-lines used for transporting harvested crops, mainly coca, across a valley 200 m below. They can also be seen in the Ladakh region of India.

In recent years, there has been renewed interest in the use of aerial ropeways for transporting cargo, partly due to their low energy requirements and environmental impact. Gravity-fed types, i.e. zip-lines, have been built in Nepal, Latin America and India.

Ziplines have also been used as a means of transporting items in Australian regions in the past. These may include ammunition, weapons, tools, food, and mail.

Recreation

Children's adventure playgrounds

Zip-lines may be designed for children's play and found on some adventure playgrounds. Inclines are fairly shallow and so the speeds kept relatively low, negating the need for a means of stopping. The term "flying fox" is commonly used in reference to such a small-scale zip-line in Australia, New Zealand, and Scotland.
With playground equipment, the pulleys are fixed to the cable, the user typically hanging onto a handgrip underneath, but occasionally including a seat or a safety strap. Return of the grip or seat is usually done by simply pushing or pulling it via a short wire back to the top of the hill on foot.

Canopy tours and adventure zip-lining

Longer and higher rides are often used as a means of accessing remote areas, such as a rainforest canopy. In the 1970s, wildlife biologists set up zip-lines as a way to study and explore the dense rainforests of Costa Rica without disturbing the environment. The business idea for zip-line canopy tours developed from these. Darren Hreniuk, a Canadian citizen who moved to Costa Rica in 1992, around the same time that a scene in the film Medicine Man incorporated the treetop rides, with the goal of using canopy tours to help raise awareness for reforestation, education and socio-economic development in the surrounding areas. In October 1998, the Costa Rican Patent Office granted patent No. 2532 for an "Elevated Forest Transport System Propelled by Gravity, Using Harness and Pulley Through a Simple Horizontal Line" to Hreniuk. The patent was later annulled and brought uncertainty to zip-line businesses, before being reinstated after twenty years.

A canopy tour (sometimes called a zip-line tour) provides a route through a wooded, and often mountainous, landscape making primary use of zip-lines and aerial bridges between platforms built in trees. Tourists are harnessed to a cable for safety, and many are restricted to adults. Heights vary from a close to the ground to high up near the treetops. Canopy tours are largely marketed under the banner of ecotourism, although the environmental impact of any type of zip-line is a disputed topic.

The terminology varies (canopy tour, zip-lining, flying fox), and the line between using zip-lines for ecotourism and zip-lining as an adventure sport is often not clearly drawn.
Zip-line tours are now popular vacation activities, found both at upscale resorts and at outdoor adventure camps, where they may be an element on a larger challenge such as a hike or ropes course.

Operation

Mechanism

A type of pulley with a grooved wheel known as a sheave is used in zip-lines, and the pulley turns as it travels along, thus reducing friction and enabling greater speed than would otherwise be possible.

The zip-line trolley is the frame or assembly together with the pulley inside that run along the cable. Zip-lines also have some kind of device to allow the cargo or rider take advantage of the pulley system. This could include a harness, seat, a cabin or often just a handhold in smaller playground applications, that attaches to the pulley by a pivoting link or carabiner which secures the load, allowing the person or cargo to travel down the line.

Braking

To be propelled by gravity, the cable needs to be on a fairly steep slope. Even then the rider or cargo will often not travel completely to the end (although this will depend on the load), and some means of safely stopping the car at the bottom end is usually needed with the larger zip-lines. Users of zip lines must have means of stopping themselves. Typical mechanisms include:

Friction created between the pulley against the cable.
Thick, purpose-built leather gloves.
A mat or netting at the lower end of the incline.
A passive arrester system composed of springs, pulleys, counterweights, bungee cord, tire or other devices, which slows and then stops the trolley's motion.
A "capture block" which is a block on the cable tethered to a rope controlled by a person who can manually apply friction on the rope to slow the user down. 
Gravity stop, exploiting the sag in the cable, where the belly of the cable is always lower than the termination point. The amount of incline on a zip-line controls the speed at which the user arrives at the termination point.
Hand brake at the end of the zip-line.

Safety
There are certain precautions that can be taken. Riders are physically attached to the cable by a harness which attaches to a removable trolley. A helmet is required on almost all courses of any size. All zip-line cables have some degree of sag, so the proper tensioning of a cable is important and allows tuning the ride of a zip-line.

Records

Longest
The ride has been closed pending the outcome into an investigation into the crash of an Agusta 139 rescue helicopter on 29 December 2018, killing all on board, thought to have clipped one of the cables.

The Zip World Bethesda line also holds the record for being the fastest Zip-Line in the world.

Steepest
There is no Guinness World Record for the world's steepest zip-line, so certainty is difficult to establish, but some contenders have been:
At Letalnica bratov Gorišek, on the ski flying hill in Planica, Slovenia (opened 19 September 2015). It has an average 38.33% and a maximum 58.6% incline.
ZipFlyer in Nepal (run by HighGround Adventures2012) with a maximum incline of 56% (and still claiming to be the world's tallest zip-line).

Oldest person to ride a zip-line
British great-grandfather Jack Reynolds became the oldest person to ride a zip-line on his 106th birthday on 6April 2018 at Go Ape in Grizedale Forest, Cumbria.

Highest elevation zipline
The La Tyrolienne in Val Thorens, France is the highest altitude zipline at 10,600 feet.

See also
Adventure park
Aerial tramway
Breeches buoy

References